North Carolina's 1st congressional district is located in the northeastern part of the state. It consists of many Black Belt counties that border Virginia and it extends southward into several counties of the Inner Banks and the Research Triangle. It covers many rural areas of northeastern North Carolina, among the state's most economically poor, as well as outer exurbs of urbanized Research Triangle. It contains towns and cities such as Greenville, Rocky Mount, Wilson, Goldsboro, Henderson, and Roanoke Rapids.

The first district is currently represented by Donald G. Davis.

On February 5, 2016, the Fourth Circuit Court of Appeals ruled the 1st district, as well as the 12th, were gerrymandered along racial lines, which was unconstitutional, and must be redrawn by March 15, 2016. It was re-drawn again in 2019 following court-mandated redistricting, which removed portions of the Research Triangle from the district and changed it to D+3 from a D+17 on the Cook Partisan Voting Index.

Besides a brief period from 1895 until 1899 when the district was held by a Populist, the 1st district has been consistently Democratic since 1883.

On February 23, 2022, the North Carolina Supreme Court approved a new map which changed the 1st district boundaries to add Chowan, Franklin, Greene, Pasquotank, Perquimans, Tyrrell and the remainder of Vance County while removing Wayne County.

Counties 
Counties in the 2023-2025 district map.
 Bertie County
 Chowan County
 Edgecombe County
 Franklin County
 Gates County
 Greene County
 Halifax County
 Hertford County
 Martin County
 Nash County
 Northampton County
 Pasquotank County
 Perquimans County
 Pitt County (part)
 Tyrrell County
 Vance County
 Warren County
 Washington County
 Wilson County

Presidential electoral history

List of members representing the district

Recent congressional races

2000

2002

2004

2006

2008

2010

2012

2014

2016

2018

2020

2022

See also

North Carolina's congressional districts
List of United States congressional districts

References

 Congressional Biographical Directory of the United States 1774–present

01